Icon is the second greatest hits album from the American rock band Blink-182, released on March 29, 2013. Icon was released following the band's departure from Interscope Records in 2012 and compiles the band's biggest singles, covering material from Dude Ranch (1997) to Blink-182 (2003).

Background
Icon is the band's second greatest hits collection. The album was part of the Icon series launched by Universal Music Enterprises, which features greatest hits releases from "major artists spanning rock, pop, R&B and country." The front cover image is a photograph taken of the band by Estevan Oriol during a photo shoot for the band's eponymous sixth album in 2003.

Reception

Allmusic reviewer Gregory Heaney called the collection a "crash course in pop-punk" that "takes listeners on a whirlwind tour of the band's back catalog while showing off an emotional range that was often masked by the band's youthful irreverence," while praising its simplicity and compact track listing, calling it a "best of the best-of."

Track listing

Personnel

Blink-182
Tom DeLonge – vocals, guitars
Mark Hoppus – vocals, bass guitar
Travis Barker – drums, percussion on all other tracks
Scott Raynor – drums (tracks 2 and 5)

Additional musicians
Roger Joseph Manning Jr. – keyboards

Artwork
Vartan – art direction
Matt Diehl – design
Ryan Null – director of photography
Estevan Oriol – photography

Production
Jerry Finn – production, mixing engineer of "Feeling This"
Mark Trombino – production, mixing engineer and keyboards on "Dammit" and "Josie"
Tom Lord-Alge – mixing engineer
Jaime Feldman – compilation producer
Laura Benanchietti – product manager
 Monique McGuffin Newman – production manager
Erick Labson – mastering engineer

References

Blink-182 albums
2010 greatest hits albums
Geffen Records compilation albums
Albums produced by Jerry Finn
Albums produced by Mark Trombino
Pop punk compilation albums